Steelhead is a rural community in British Columbia, Canada, located in the northern District of Mission and east of Stave Falls.

References

External links
 http://www.steelheadcommunity.com/
Settlements in British Columbia
Mission, British Columbia